Brochon is a commune in the Côte-d'Or department in eastern France.

Population

Wine
Some of the vineyards in Brochon are part of the appellation d'origine contrôlée Gevrey-Chambertin, and some are part of Fixin appellation. There is no Brochon appellation.

Twin towns
Brochon is twinned with:
 Weinolsheim, Germany

See also
Communes of the Côte-d'Or department

References

Communes of Côte-d'Or
Côte-d'Or communes articles needing translation from French Wikipedia